The Tom Bergin Trophy is an award given to the man-of-the-match in the annual Championship Grand Final. The award is named after Tom Bergin, a former president of the Rugby League Writers' Association and former editor for the Salford City Reporter. The trophy was first awarded in the Second Division Premiership Final of the 1986–87 season.

In 1998, the Divisional Premiership final was replaced with a play-off system, and the trophy continued to be used as a man-of-the-match award for the Grand Final of the play-offs.

Recipients

See also

References

External links

Rugby league trophies and awards
Championship (rugby league)
Rugby Football League Championship